Stendal Vorbahnhof is a railway station in the town of Stendal, Saxony-Anhalt, Germany. The station lies on the Stendal-Tangermünde railway and the train services are operated by Hanseatische Eisenbahn.

Train services
The station is served by the following services:
regional bahn  Stendal - Tangemünde

References

Railway stations in Saxony-Anhalt
Buildings and structures in Stendal (district)
Stendal